Lalomoana is a small settlement located in Olosega island in Ofu-Olosega on the slopes on Piumafua, in Manu‘a Group of the Samoan Islands—part of American Samoa.  No roads connect to the settlement.

References

Populated places in American Samoa